The Supermarine Sea Urchin was an unbuilt British racing biplane flying boat designed by the Supermarine Aviation Works to compete in the 1924 Schneider Trophy. It was to be a single seat biplane, powered by a Rolls-Royce Condor V-12 water-cooled engine buried in the fuselage, driving a pusher propeller mounted on the upper wing via geared shafts. It was abandoned without being built owing to problems with the engine and the transmission required to drive the propeller.

Specifications (Sea Urchin - estimated)

See also

References

Sources
 

1920s British sport aircraft
Flying boats
Sea Urchin
Single-engined pusher aircraft
Biplanes
Schneider Trophy
Mid-engined aircraft